Gary Wayne Harris (born 31 May 1959) is an English former professional footballer. He made four appearances in the Football League for Cardiff City between 1977 and 1980.

References

1959 births
Living people
English footballers
Cardiff City F.C. players
Trowbridge Town F.C. players
Gloucester City A.F.C. players
English Football League players
Association football wingers
Footballers from Birmingham, West Midlands
20th-century English people